Amber Leibrock (born February 8, 1988) is an American mixed martial artist who competes in the Featherweight division in Professional Fighters League. (PFL)

Mixed Martial Arts career

Leibrock gained entry  into Invicta FC by defeating Paola Ramirez at Tuff-N-Uff: Xtreme Couture vs Syndicate MMA amateur tournament to win a pro contract with the organization.

Invicta FC

Amber Leibrock began her pro debut by viciously knocking out highly touted Marina Shafir. Leibrock's next opponent was Megan Anderson who she lost to at Invicta FC 15: Cyborg vs. Ibragimova, before bouncing back with a win against Amy Coleman at Invicta FC 19: Maia vs. Modafferi.

Bellator MMA
Leibrock made her promotional debut against Janay Harding at Bellator 199 on May 12, 2018. She won the bout via unanimous decision.

Leibrock faced Arlene Blencowe on September 29, 2018, at Bellator at Bellator 206.  She lost the fight via technical knockout in the third round.

Leibrock faced Amanda Bell on February 15, 2019, at Bellator 215, losing via TKO stoppage in the first round.

Leibrock faced Jessica Borga on September 7, 2019 at Bellator 226, losing via first round armbar submission.

Professional Fighters League 
After winning all three of her bouts after her Bellator release, culminating will a first round rear-naked choke at Invicta FC 48, Leibrock signed with PFL and is set to start off the 2023 season against Martina Jindrová on April 7, 2023 at PFL 2.

Mixed martial arts record

|-
|Win
|align=center|6–4
|Morgan Frier
|Submission (rear-naked choke)
|Invicta FC 48
|
|align=center|1
|align=center|3:09
|Denver, Colorado, United States
|
|-
|Win
|align=center|5–4
|Devon Holmes
|TKO (punches)
|Gladiator Challenge: Underground III
|
|align=center|1
|align=center|0:20
|Valley Center, California, United States
|
|-
|Win
|align=center|4–4
|Meagan Marie
|TKO (punches)
|Gladiator Challenge: Best in the West
|
|align=center|1
|align=center|0:35
|San Jacinto, California, United States
|
|-
| Loss
| align=center|3–4
|Jessica Borga
|Submission (armbar)
|Bellator 226
|
|align=center| 1 
|align=center| 4:45
|San Jose, California, United States
| 
|-
| Loss
| align=center| 3–3
|Amanda Bell
|TKO (punches)
|Bellator 215
|
|align=center| 1 
|align=center| 3:52
|Uncasville, Connecticut, United States
| 
|-
| Loss
| align=center| 3–2
| Arlene Blencowe
| TKO (slam and punches)
| Bellator 206
| 
| align=center|3
| align=center|1:23
| San Jose, California, United States
|
|-
| Win
| align=center| 3–1
| Janay Harding
| Decision (unanimous)
| Bellator 199
| 
| align=center|3
| align=center|5:00
| San Jose, California, United States
|
|-
| Win
| align=center| 2–1
| Amy Coleman
| TKO (knees and punches)
| Invicta FC 19: Maia vs. Modafferi
| 
| align=center|1
| align=center|3:15
| Kansas City, Missouri, United States
|
|-
| Loss
| align=center| 1–1
| Megan Anderson
| TKO (knees and punches)
| Invicta FC 15: Cyborg vs. Ibragimova
| 
| align=center|3
| align=center|2:33
| Costa Mesa, California, United States
| 
|-
| Win
| align=center| 1–0
| Marina Shafir
| TKO (punches)
| Invicta FC 13: Cyborg vs. Van Duin
| 
| align=center|1
| align=center|0:37
| Las Vegas, Nevada, United States
|
|-

References

External links
 Amber Leibrock at Bellator (archived)
 

1988 births
Living people
American female mixed martial artists
Featherweight mixed martial artists
Bellator female fighters
Mixed martial artists from California
Sportspeople from Hayward, California
21st-century American women